Aingae, commonly known as Cofán or Kofán, is the primary language of the Ai (Cofán) people, an indigenous group whose ancestral territory lies at the interface between the Andean foothills and Amazonia in the northeast of Ecuador (Sucumbíos province) and southern Colombia (Putumayo & Nariño provinces).

While past classifications have identified Cofán as belonging to linguistic families such as Chibchan or Andean B, it is now widely agreed to be a language isolate, with no known genetic relatives. Although still robustly learned by children in Ecuadorian communities, it is considered an 'endangered language with estimates of around 1500 native speakers.

History and Current Status 
Aingae is a language isolate of Amazonia spoken by the Cofán people in the province of Sucumbios in Northeastern Ecuador and the provinces of Putumayo and Nariño in Southern Columbia. The language has approximately 1500 speakers and is relatively vital in Ecuador and severely endangered in Colombia. However, language attitudes about Aingae are positive and it is considered foundational to Cofán identity and community (Cepek 2012).

The Ai are traditionally hunter-gatherers who historically spanned over a large territory (AnderBois et al. 2019). In Ecuador, the Cofán have resisted conquest by the Inca and colonization by the Spanish, as well as anti-indigenous policies by the Ecuadorian government. The pre-Columbian Cofán population is estimated at 60,000 to 70,000. Though the origin of the Cofán is the Eastern Andean Cordilleras, Inca encroachment pushed the Cofán to the eastern lowlands, which they still inhabit today. The Cofán have undergone de facto segregation codified by the Ecuadorian government, a measles outbreak in 1923 that reduced the population to a few hundred, and illegal oil extraction that threatened the environment in Cofán territory and the Cofán way of life. The Cofán have played a major role in the Indigenous movement in Ecuador, and in 2018 they won a judicial case recognizing their right to decide over environmental activities in their territory and prohibiting the continued operation of mining activities.

The Cofán's religious tradition is shamanistic, and a key cultural value of the Cofán is harmonious conviviality. In addition, participation in cultural practices such as drinking yaje and traditional skills like hunting and housebuilding, rather than descent or ethnicity, plays a large role in determining one's status as an ai (Cepek 2012). The Cofán credit their strong linguistic identity for their ability to withstand colonial oppression and protect their traditional way of life.

Aingae is a language isolate. The language has considerable Amazonian borrowings from Tukanoan and Cariban languages, as well as many Quechuan borrowings. While there have been previous claims of genetic ties or language contact of Aingae to Barbacoan, Chicham, and Chibchan, it has been determined that there are no substantial borrowings. No complete grammar of the language has been produced.

The name of the language, Aingae, which consists of the stem ai ('person, Cofán person, civilized person') and the manner clitic =ngae, means 'in the manner of the people'. Though the speakers use the word Aingae, the language is also known by the Spanish denomination Cofán.

Writing System (Orthography) 
Aingae has two principal orthographies, both using the Latin alphabet. The first was developed by missionaries Marlytte and Roberta Borman, and first employed in M. Borman (1962). This orthography was influenced by Spanish and thus contained some needless complexity such as representing the phoneme /k/ with  before front vowels, and with  elsewhere. Borman also conveyed aspirated obstruents via reduplication instead of via <h> insertion like in the modern orthography. More recently, the Cofán community has created and widely adopted a new writing system which aimed to solve some of the opacities of Borman's script. A comparison between the two orthographies can be observed in the tables below:

* The prenasalized voiced stops and affricates are written without a homorganic nasal at the beginning of words. This is because word-initially, voiced stops are realized with less nasality than they are word-medially, hence the orthographic representation. However Repetti-Ludlow et al. (2020) found that there is still some nasalisation present.

Phonology 
Aingae has 27 consonants as well as 5 oral monophthongs and 6 oral diphthongs, each with a nasal counterpart which is contrastive. The language is currently considered to have an unknown amount of dialectal variation. It is quite likely that there is some, but no concrete research and evidence has been put forward to make a strong claim either way, warranting further investigation.

Consonants 
The 27 consonant phonemes are listed below in the table with their IPA representations. In Aingae, there is a three-way, contrastive distinction between voiceless, aspirated, and prenasalized plosives and affricates. There are no such distinctions for fricatives. All consonants can be word-initial, except for /ʔ/ and /ɰ/. Note that glottal stop, although phonologically contrastive, can be realized as creakiness.

Vowels 
The 5 oral vowels and their nasal counterparts are listed in the table below with their IPA representation. The 6 diphthongs and their nasal counterparts in IPA representation are the following: [ai]/[ãĩ], [oe]/[õẽ], [oa]/[õã], [oi]/[õĩ], [ɨi]/[ɨ̃ĩ], and [ao]/[ãõ].

Diphthongs 
When vowels appear adjacent to one another, they either become a diphthong (for the pairs listed above) or a glide is inserted if a diphthong does not exist for that pair. For example:

Note that the vowel pair /ae/ is realized as [ai].

Triphthongs do not exist in Aingae, and glottal stops are inserted phonemically when a sequence of three vowels would occur as in example (1) below.

Nasalization 
Nasalization is a major feature of the Aingae sound system. As already seen, there are contrastive prenasalized consonants as well as contrastive nasal counterparts to all monophthongs and diphthongs. Example (4) below demonstrates their contrasting nature:

 (4a) /hi/  [hi] 'to come'
 (4b) /hĩ/  [hĩ] 'to exist'

Along with being contrastive, nasalization also plays a key phonological role in the surface realization of morphemes, working both backwards and forwards. The consonants /p/, /t/, /ʋ/, and /j/ all become nasalized when following a nasal vowel, becoming /ᵐb/, /ⁿd/, /m/, and /ɲ/, respectively, as in examples (5) and (6).

 (5a) /ha-pa/  [ha.pa] (go-SS) 'to go'
 (5b) /hẽ-pa/  [hẽ.ᵐba] (sound-SS) 'to sound'
 (6a) /hi-ʔja/  [hiʔ.ja] (come-VER) 'does come'
 (6b) /hĩ-ʔja/  [hĩʔ.ɲã] (exist-VER) 'does exist'

Note that nasalization of vowels can cross consonant boundaries when the vowels are separated by a glottal fricative /h/ or glottal stop /ʔ/ (even when a glide is present) as in example (*) above and example (7) below:

 (7a) /tsɨi-ʔhe/  [tsɨiʔ.he] (walk-IPFV) 'walking'}
 (7b) /tsõ-ʔhe/  [tsõʔ.hẽ] (do-IPFV) 'doing'

Additionally, oral vowels become nasalized when preceding prenasalized consonants and when following nasal consonants, as in examples (8) and (9). They also become nasalized when either preceded or followed by a nasal vowel, as in examples (10) and (11).

 (8) /dɨ.ʃo-ⁿde.kʰɨ/  [dɨ.ʃõ.ⁿde.kʰɨ] (child-PLH) 'children'
 (9) /ɲoɲa-pa/  [ɲõɲã.ᵐba] (make-SS) 'make
 (10) /ho.ʋaʔ-kã-o/  [ho.ʋaʔ.kãõ] (DIST-CMP-AUG) 'exactly like that'
 (11) /bɨtʰo-ĩ/  [bɨtʰõĩ] (run-MVM) 'run'

Syllable Structure 
Aingae syllable structure is (C)V(ʔ), with many variations thereof. At minimum a syllable can be a singular vowel and at maximum can be consonant onset with a diphthong nucleus and glottal stop coda. Note that vowel length is not a relevant feature in syllable structure. A complete list of the structures allowed is given in the table below with examples for each.

Prosody 
Generally speaking, in the absence of a glottal stop, stress in Aingae is found on the penultimate syllable as in examples (12a) and (12b). When a glottal stop is present however, stress is found on the syllable with the second mora before the glottal stop (Dąbkowski, 2020), compare examples (13a) and (13b). This is a stress pattern that is currently cross-linguistically unattested.

 (12a) [ˈfe.tʰa]                 'open'
 (12b) [fe.ˈtʰa.hi]             'open-PRCM'
 (13a) [ˈfe.tʰa.ʔhe]          'open-IPFV'
 (13b) [fɨn.ˈdɨi.ʔhe]          'sweep-IPFV'

Stress can in some cases be contrastive, compare (14a) and (14b). (R-L)
 (14a) [ˈnẽ.pi]                   'disappear'
 (14b) [nẽ.ˈpi]                   'arrive'

Morphology 
Morphology in A'ingae consists of stems, clitics, and suffixes. Free stems include nouns, verbs, adjectives, adverbials, and meteorological stems (such as words for "wind", "rain", and "sun").

While many stems are free, there are also a number of bound stems, which typically express states of being or properties, and are in a class of "flexible stems" by themselves. In the following sentence, bia "long" is one of these bound stems.

Beyond stems, A'ingae has both bound suffixes and clitics, specifically enclitics that appear after the stem. There are no known prefixes or proclitics. In glossed content, suffixes are typically notated with a hyphen, and clitics are notated with an equal sign. The language has a very rich inventory of clitics, that can appear either at sentence level or constituent level. Sentence-level clitics occur at second position, meaning they attach to the end of the first word in a sentence, and mark qualities such as subject and sentence type.

Constituent-level clitics can either attach to the noun phrase or subordinate clause, or to the predicate clause. Clitics in the noun phrase occur in a fixed order, and can mark case, negation, and other grammatical features.

Suffixes also mark certain grammatical features. Some example include sentential type/mood, nominalization, and aspect. Passive, causative, and shape features are also indicated with suffixes.

Also present in the language is the process of reduplication, which expresses iterative aspect.

Inflectional Template 

Clitics and suffixes in the language have a relatively fixed order of how they will attach to a verb or predicate phrase.

Pronouns

Syntax 
Constituent order in matrix clauses in A'ingae is relatively flexible, with SOV (or SO-predicate) considered basic. In embedded clauses, word order is more rigidly SOV/SOPred. Clauses must minimally consist of a predicate.

Subordinate clauses are strictly predicate-final.

Case and Alignment 
Case markers are constituent-level clitics.

The full list of case markers is shown below.

Note that there are two accusative case markers. Accusative 2 typically is used in negative sentences or when the P-argument is not yet present or does not exist, in contexts of expressing desire, causation, or creation.

Sentences follow a nominative-accusative pattern. A'ingae displays optional agreement—optional agreement in person using second position clitics, and optional agreement in number using the clitic ='fa--both of which agree with the subject argument. Within the noun phrase, there is no agreement.

Sentence Type 
A'ingae distinguishes between several different sentence types. These distinctions are indicated using different morphosyntactic strategies. Declarative sentences can contain the optional veridical clitic ='ya. There are several imperative types, depending on what speech act is being performed, using either the imperative clitics =ja or ='se or the diminutive suffix ='kha. There is a distinction between yes/no interrogative and content interrogative sentences, with the former using the interrogative clitic =ti and the latter using the indeterminate/interrogative wh-word in the initial position (jungaesû ("what"), maki ("when"), mani ("where"), majan ("which"), mikun ("why"), mingae ("how")). Exhortative sentences use the hortative particle jinge. Prohibitive sentences use the clitic =jama. Below are some examples of these sentence types.

Assertive/Declarative

Imperative

Yes/no-Interrogative

Content Interrogative

Exhortative

Prohibitive

Useful Words and Phrases

Sample Passage

A'ingae passage 
"Umbakhûnisû Fingian tuyakaen kuejete afakhujefa majan de titshe kiankhe, tsunjeninde jakansû tumbia savutshia upûijenga findiyechu ji

Tansifate tsa majan utie tise jakansû findiyechu upûijema ushichhachhu titshe kiañe

Tsumbate, umbanisû fingian ûfa kiame tise ushafanga, tsama tise titshe ûfani jakansû tise upûijema findi; usefapanga umbakhûnisû fingian ushambipa anthe

Tsunsite kueje savutshi chanjun, tsuinkhûte favatsheyi jacansu tise upûijema ushicha

Tsumbate umbanisû fingian tansiñachovedaya tsa kueje khuanginga injani titshe kiankhe."

IPA phonetic transcription 
"

[ˈt͡sõ.mba.teˈõ.mba.ni.sɨ fĩ.ŋgiãˈɨ.fakiã̰.mẽˈti.seˈu.ʃa̰.fã̰.ŋgaˈt͡sa.maˈti.seˈti.t͡sʰeˈɨ.fa̰.niˈha.kã.sɨ ˈti.se o.ˈpuḭ.hẽ.mã ˈfĩ.ndi o. ˈse.faʔ.pã.ŋga õ. ˈmba.kʰɨ.nḭ.su ˈfĩ.ŋgiã u. ˈʃã.mbi.pa ã.tʰḛ]

"

English translation 
"The North Wind and the Sun were disputing which was the stronger, when a traveler came along wrapped in a warm cloak.

They agreed that the one who first succeeded in making the traveler take his cloak off should be considered stronger than the other.

Then the North Wind blew as hard as he could, but the more he blew the more closely did the traveler fold his cloak around him; and at last the North Wind gave up the attempt.

Then the Sun shone out warmly, and immediately the traveler took off his cloak.

And so the North Wind was obliged to confess that the Sun was the stronger of the two."

Further reading 
 Dąbkowski, Maksymilian. 2021. Aingae (Ecuador and Colombia) - Language Snapshot. Language Documentation and Description 20, 1-12.
 Baldauf, R. B., Kaplan, R. B., King, K. A., & Haboud, M. (2007). Language planning and policy in Latin America: Language Planning and Policy in Ecuador (Vol. 1). Clevedon: Multilingual Matters.
 
Borman, M. B. (1976). Vocabulario cofán: Cofán-castellano, castellano-cofán. (Serie de vocabularios indígenas Mariano Silva y Aceves, 19). Quito: Summer Institute of Linguistics.
 
 Borman, M. B. (1990). Cofan cosmology and history as revealed in their legends: The Cofan Alphabet. Quito, Ecuador: Instituto Linguistico de Verano.
 Hammarström, Harald; Forkel, Robert; Haspelmath, Martin; Bank, Sebastian, eds. (2016). "Cofán". Glottolog 2.7. Jena: Max Planck Institute for the Science of Human History.
 Gijn, E. V., Haude, K., & Muysken, P. (2011). Subordination in native South-American languages. Amsterdam: John Benjamins Pub. Co.
 Klein, H. E., & Stark, L. R. (2011). South American Indian languages: retrospect and prospect. Austin: University of Texas Press.

References

ACC1:accusative case
ACC2:accusative case
ADN:adnominalizer
ANA:anaphoric
ANA.LOC:anaphoric locative
ANG:angular
CMP:comparative
DIST2:distal
DMN:diminutive
HORT2:hortative
IMP3:imperative mood
LAT:lateral
NEW:new topic
PLH:human plural
PLS:plural subject
PRCM:preculminative
PRHB:prohibitive mood
RPRT:reportative
SFC:surface
SH:shape

External links
Alain Fabre, 2005, Diccionario etnolingüístico y guía bibliográfica de los pueblos indígenas sudamericanos: COFÁN
ELAR archive of  A'ingae language documentation materials
Cofán (Intercontinental Dictionary Series)

Indigenous languages of the South American Northern Foothills
Languages of Colombia
Languages of Ecuador
Language isolates of South America
Endangered language isolates
Endangered indigenous languages of the Americas